Metadiaea is a genus of spiders in the family Thomisidae. It was first described in 1929 by Mello-Leitão. , it contains only one species, Metadiaea fidelis, from Brazil.

References

Thomisidae
Monotypic Araneomorphae genera
Spiders of Brazil